Aztag is a daily newspaper and the official newspaper of the Armenian Revolutionary Federation (Dashnaktsutiun) in Lebanon. The editor in chief is Shahan Kandaharian.

Aztag was started in 1927 and the first issue appeared on 5 March 1927 in Beirut, Lebanon. Also the following supplements of Aztag are published: 
"Bzdig-mzdig" (children supplement)
"Navasart" (sports)
"Anahid"
"Aztag Kragan - Aztag Arvesdi" (literary / cultural)

The newspaper also runs an online service in Armenian and Arabic.

References

External links
Aztag Official website
Aztag Arabic language website
Aztag Kragan - literary supplement (pdf of 2012, number 3 issue)
Kevork Yazdjian, Lebanese-Armenian press in 2002, Yerevan, 2004, 47 p. 

1927 establishments in Mandatory Syria
Armenian-language newspapers published in Lebanon
Arabic-language newspapers
Newspapers published in Beirut
Publications established in 1927
Daily newspapers published in Lebanon